For articles on Irish television in the 1970s please see:
1970 in Irish television
1971 in Irish television
1972 in Irish television
1973 in Irish television
1974 in Irish television
1975 in Irish television
1976 in Irish television
1977 in Irish television
1978 in Irish television
1979 in Irish television

 
Television in Ireland